William Murray was an Anglican bishop in the first half of the Seventeenth century.

Formerly Chaplain-in-Ordinary to King James I & VI he was nominated Bishop of Kilfenora on 15 March 1622 and consecrated on 18 December that year. He was translated to Llandaff on 24 December 1627.

Notes

See also

Bishops of Kilfenora (Church of Ireland)
Bishops of Llandaff
17th-century Anglican bishops in Ireland